The 1889 Louisville Colonels season was a season in American baseball. The team finished with a 27–111 record, last in the American Association.

The Colonels were the first Major League team to lose more than 100 games in a season. The previous record for losses was 92, set by the Washington Nationals in 1886 and matched by the Cleveland Blues in 1887. The record would be broken again in 1890 by the Pittsburgh Alleghenys, but remained the AA record until the league folded in 1891.

Offseason
Prior to the start of the season, team owner Mordecai Davidson brought in Dude Esterbrook to manage the team, replacing Davidson himself. He was also seeking a buyer for the team, as his own finances were precarious.

Regular season

Early season woes
The 1889 season was a tumultuous one for the Colonels. Manager Esterbrook fined several players, and was fired just ten games into the season. Outfielder Jimmy "Chicken" Wolf was appointed team captain, although Davidson traveled with the team as well to ensure their good behavior – which proved quite unpopular.

Davidson continued to attempt to sell the club as the season progressed, but to no avail. He, too, began levying fines, and the local media was harsh on both the owner and the team. On May 22, the team began a losing streak that would eventually reach 26 straight games, which still stands as the all-time Major League record as of 2018. Most of the losses came during a stretch from May 24 until July 1 in which the team played just three games at home.

The strike
Things were no better from the perspective of the AA. Financial difficulties had caused the team to miss payroll on three occasions, and the players alerted AA president Wheeler C. Wyckoff to the problem. This led the AA to call a meeting to discuss the issue on June 14. On the way to the meeting, Davidson was confronted by his players calling for the rescinding of previous fines, threatening to strike if refused. Davidson instead upped the ante, threatening to fine the players further if they lost.

The team was scheduled to play against the Baltimore Orioles that day, and following Davidson's actions, five members of the club refused to take the field. Three local semi-pro players, Charles Fisher, Mike Gaule and John Traffley, were recruited to join the remaining players on the field to allow the game to commence. The game was cancelled after just two innings due to rain, and was rescheduled for the following day.

At the meeting, Davidson admitted that he could not fulfill his obligations of ownership, but left promising to strengthen the team upon threat of the league taking control of the franchise. Davidson and Wyckoff met the players at their hotel the next day, but Davidson still refused to rescind the player fines. The team took the field with the semi-pros still in the lineup, losing 4–2 in a game shortened by rain to five innings. The second game was cancelled, and Wyckoff promised the players a hearing to return to the club for the next game. None of the three replacements ever played in the majors again.

Continuing problems
Davidson met payroll on June 21, but only by accounting for new fines to the team's players. In some cases, the fines exceeded the players' salary, and they were told they owed the club money. Star outfielder Pete Browning was fined $335, and total team fines came to $1,800, $1,200 of which was attributed to the walkout. Guy Hecker began taking steps towards founding a branch of John Montgomery Ward's Brotherhood of Professional Base Ball Players for the AA. On June 24, Davidson hired local bouncer Buck McKinney, ostensibly as team manager. While Wolf continued to handle on-field duties, McKinney traveled with the team to keep an eye on the players for the owner.

Davidson gives up
By July 2, however, another payroll was due, and when it became apparent that he would be unable to meet it, Davidson decided to turn the team over to the AA. He did so officially on July 5, at the same time that the players received their hearing from Wyckoff. On July 10, all previous fines were remitted, with the exception of those associated with the June 15 walkout. While local owners were quickly secured, the team continued to spiral downward, and after the season the team was bought by local distillery owner Barney Dreyfuss.

Season standings

Record vs. opponents

Opening Day lineup

Roster

Player stats

Batting

Starters by position
Note: Pos = Position; G = Games played; AB = At bats; H = Hits; Avg. = Batting average; HR = Home runs; RBI = Runs batted in

Other batters
Note: G = Games played; AB = At bats; H = Hits; Avg. = Batting average; HR = Home runs; RBI = Runs batted in

Pitching

Starting pitchers
Note: G = Games pitched; IP = Innings pitched; W = Wins; L = Losses; ERA = Earned run average; SO = Strikeouts

Notes

References
 1889 Louisville Colonels team page at Baseball Reference

Louisville Colonels seasons
Louisville Colonels season
Louisville Colonels